Nowie is a locality in Victoria, Australia, located approximately 26 km from Swan Hill, Victoria.

A Post Office opened as Hill's around 1914, was renamed Nowie South in 1915 and closed in 1918. A Nowie North Post Office opened on 1 July 1923 and closed in 1958.

References

Towns in Victoria (Australia)
Rural City of Swan Hill